Ballymacarbry is a village in County Waterford, Ireland with an approximate population of 140 people. It is situated on the R671 regional road, approximately 17 km from Clonmel and 24 km from Dungarvan. The local Gaelic games club is The Nire–Fourmilewater.

References

Towns and villages in County Waterford